Kenny Gradney (born February 25, 1950, in Baton Rouge) is an American bassist and songwriter, best known as a member of the band Little Feat.  He joined after their second album, replacing founding bassist Roy Estrada in 1972. Gradney has remained their bassist ever since and coinciding with his arrival, his friend Sam Clayton also joined the band on percussion and Paul Barrere, who knew bandleader Lowell George from Hollywood High School, joined as a second guitarist and cementing the classic line-up of George, Barrere, Richie Hayward, Bill Payne, Gradney and Clayton.

In the summer of 1970, Gradney participated in a multi-group tour of Canadian stadium shows known as Festival Express as a member of Delaney & Bonnie & Friends in which all of the groups traveled together on a passenger train. He appears in the documentary film of the same name playing and partying with Janis Joplin, Bob Weir, Jerry Garcia, Rick Danko and others.

In addition to his work with Little Feat, Gradney has played and recorded with many notable musicians, including Delaney & Bonnie, The Flying Burrito Brothers, Bob Weir's Bobby and the Midnites, Jazz Is Dead, jazz drummer Chico Hamilton, Warren Zevon, Robert Palmer, Mick Fleetwood, and Carly Simon.

References

External links 
 Biography on the official Little Feat website

Guitarists from California
Living people
Jazz musicians from New Orleans
American funk bass guitarists
American male bass guitarists
American male guitarists
Little Feat members
American rock bass guitarists
American session musicians
American rhythm and blues bass guitarists
American jazz bass guitarists
American male songwriters
Guitarists from Louisiana
Bobby and the Midnites members
American male jazz musicians
Jazz Is Dead members
20th-century American bass guitarists
1952 births